The 1961 South African Grand Prix, formally titled the 8th International RAC South African Grand Prix, was a non-championship Formula One motor race held at Prince George Circuit, East London, South Africa on 26 December 1961. The race, run over 80 laps of the circuit, was won from pole position by Scotland's Jim Clark, driving a works Lotus-Climax. Englishman Stirling Moss finished second in a private Lotus-Climax, while Swede Jo Bonnier was third in a Porsche.

Results

Notes 
Pole position: Jim Clark – 1:33.9
Fastest Lap: Jim Clark – 1:33.1
Doug Serrurier was also entered by Scuderia Alfa, to drive an LDS-Alfa Romeo, but did not drive this car during the event.

References

 "The Formula One Record Book", John Thompson, 1974.
 Race results at Silhouet.com

South African Grand Prix
Grand Prix
South African Grand Prix
December 1961 sports events in Africa